Brachydactyly-preaxial hallux varus syndrome, also known as 'Christian brachydactyly, is a rare congenital and genetic limb malformation syndrome which is characterized by hallux varus, brachydactyly type D and Morton's toe, alongside the adduction of said digits. Intellectual disabilities have also been reported. 10 cases have been described in medical literature.

References 

Rare diseases
Genetic diseases and disorders